Nemoria pulcherrima is a species of emerald moth in the family Geometridae first described by William Barnes and James Halliday McDunnough in 1916. It is found in North America.

The MONA or Hodges number for Nemoria pulcherrima is 7016.

References

Further reading

External links

 

Geometrinae
Articles created by Qbugbot
Moths described in 1916